Nueva Generación is the third studio album released by Puerto Rican reggaeton artist Speedy.

Track listing 
 Siéntelo (Remix) (featuring Lumidee)
 Metele Duro Mami
 Amor Con la Ropa
 Para Que Bailen (featuring Daddy Yankee)
 Vamos Alla (featuring Great Kilo, Blade Pacino & Dj Blass)
 Rosa
 Ven Donde Mi
 Quieres Bailar Reggaeton
 Yales Danzan
 De Todas las Veses (featuring Alex & Gaby)
 Yo Quiero Darte (featuring Yaga y Mackie Ranks)
 Girla

2005 albums
Speedy (musician) albums